Khvor Khvoreh (also Romanized as Khowr Khowreh, Khowrkhowreh, Khowr Khowreh, and Khūr Khūreh; also known as Khoorkhoreh and Khorkhoreh) is a village in Khvor Khvoreh Rural District, in the Central District of Bijar County, Kurdistan Province, Iran. At the 2006 census, its population was 872, in 180 families. The village is populated by Kurds with an Azerbaijani minority.

References 

Towns and villages in Bijar County
Kurdish settlements in Kurdistan Province
Azerbaijani settlements in Kurdistan Province